Maria "Rie" van Veen (also Ria, Rietje) (11 February 1923 in Rotterdam – 1995) was a Dutch swimmer who won three medals at the 1938 European Aquatics Championships. Earlier on 26 February 1938 she set a new world record in the 200 m freestyle. Between 1938 and 1942 she won all national titles in the 100 m and 400 m freestyle events; she also won the 100 m in 1937. She married Adrianus "Arie" Thuis, a swimming coach from Haarlem, on 27 May 1943 and retired shortly thereafter.

See also
 World record progression 200 metres freestyle

References

1923 births
1995 deaths
Dutch female freestyle swimmers
European Aquatics Championships medalists in swimming
World record setters in swimming
Swimmers from Rotterdam
20th-century Dutch women